Weigh anchor is a nautical term indicating the final preparation of a sea vessel for getting underway.

Weighing anchor literally means raising the anchor of the vessel from the sea floor and hoisting it up to be stowed on board the vessel.  At the moment when the anchor is no longer touching the sea floor, it is aweigh.

Example of use

USS Marvel (AM-262)'s narrative is described in part in DANFS as "On 17 January 1945 she weighed anchor and began a 2-1/2-month cruise to Kodiak, Alaska."

When not at anchor

When a vessel is not at anchor, but tied to a pier or to another anchored vessel, it does not weigh anchor; the captain or master gives the order to "take in lines."

References
 

Nautical terminology
Ship anchors